Events from the year 1641 in England.

Incumbents
 Monarch – Charles I
 Parliament – Royalist Long

Events
 23 January – Edward Littleton, 1st Baron Lyttleton of Mounslow appointed Lord Keeper of the Great Seal.
 29 January – Oliver St John appointed Solicitor General.
 15 February – Parliament passes the Triennial Act.
 March–May – First Army Plot, an attempt to use the army to support the king against parliament.
 2 May – Mary, Princess Royal, 9 year-old eldest daughter of the King, marries 14-year old William II of Orange in the Chapel Royal of Whitehall Palace in London.
 12 May – execution of Thomas Wentworth, 1st Earl of Strafford.
 June – Second Army Plot.
 5 July – Parliament abolishes the Court of High Commission, Star Chamber and the Council of the North.
 30 July – Parliament declares that any adult male not signing the Protestation of 1641, an oath of allegiance to the King and Church of England authored in May, is unfit to hold public office.
 7 August – ship money declared illegal by Parliament.
 21 August – the Scottish Covenanter army leaves Newcastle upon Tyne.
 23 October – Irish Rebellion breaks out.
 12 November – Parliament votes to send an army to Ireland to fight the Irish Rebellion.
 1 December – the Grand Remonstrance, passed by the Long Parliament on 22 November, is presented to King Charles.
 First publication of the supposed prophecies of Yorkshire soothsayer Mother Shipton (died 1561),  (London).

Births
 8 April
 Henry Sydney, 1st Earl of Romney, statesman (died 1704)
 (bapt.) – William Wycherley, playwright (died 1716)
 16 May – Dudley North, economist, merchant and politician (died 1691)

Deaths
 3 January – Jeremiah Horrocks, astronomer (born c. 1618)
 6 April (bur.) – Thomas Nabbes, dramatist (born 1605)
 13 April – Richard Montagu, clergyman (born 1577)
 12 May –  Thomas Wentworth, Earl of Strafford, statesman (born 1593)
 16 August –  Thomas Heywood, playwright, actor, poet and author (born c 1554)

References

 
Years of the 17th century in England